The Bent County Courthouse and Jail, of Bent County, Colorado, at 725 Carson Ave. in Las Animas, was built in 1887.  It was listed on the National Register of Historic Places in 1976;  the listing included two contributing buildings.

The courthouse building was built and furnished for a total of $58,429, during 1886–1889.  Its architecture is described positively in its NRHP nomination.

The NRHP listing includes also the 1902 Bent County Jail, a  two-story brick building, and a brick garage and another brick extension building.

References 

Courthouses on the National Register of Historic Places in Colorado
Jails on the National Register of Historic Places in Colorado
Government buildings completed in 1887
Buildings and structures in Bent County, Colorado
County courthouses in Colorado
Jails in Colorado
Victorian architecture in Colorado
1887 establishments in Colorado
National Register of Historic Places in Bent County, Colorado